Barnett Shoals is a ghost town in Oconee County, in the U.S. state of Georgia. Variant names were "Barnetts Fort" and "Rutherford".(dead link)

History
Barnett Shoals had its start as a mill town, anchored by the Star Thread Mill. The Georgia General Assembly incorporated Barnett Shoals as a town in 1915. The town was officially dissolved in 1995.

References

Geography of Oconee County, Georgia
Ghost towns in Georgia (U.S. state)